Robert Nadeau may refer to:

 Robert Nadeau (aikidoka) (born 1937), American aikido teacher
 Robert Nadeau (science historian) (born 1944), American professor of English at George Mason University